The 12th Wisconsin Infantry Regiment was an infantry regiment that served in the Union Army during the American Civil War.

Service
The 12th Wisconsin was raised at Madison, Wisconsin, and mustered into Federal service October 18, 1861.

The regiment was mustered out on July 20, 1865, at Louisville, Kentucky.

Total enlistment and casualties
The 12th Wisconsin lost 3 officers and 93 enlisted men killed in action or who later died of their wounds, plus another 3 officers and 224 enlisted men who died of disease, for a total of 323 fatalities.

Commanders
 Colonel George E. Bryant
 Colonel James Kerr Proudfit

Notable people
 Van S. Bennett was captain of Co. I.  After the war he served as a Wisconsin state senator.
 Harlan P. Bird was enlisted in Co. F and was then promoted to sergeant major of the regiment. In 1863 he was commissioned 2nd lieutenant of Co. G and was later promoted to 1st lieutenant.  He was wounded at Vicksburg and was subsequently detailed as an adjutant for the brigade, quartermaster for XVII Corps, and ordinance officer for the division. After the war he served as a Wisconsin state senator. 
 Ephraim Blakeslee was 1st sergeant of Co. B for one year, and was then commissioned 2nd lieutenant of Co. H, rising to the rank of captain near the end of the war.  After the war he served as a Wisconsin legislator.
 Michael J. Cantwell was 1st lieutenant in Co. C and acting quartermaster.  After the war he served as a Wisconsin legislator.
 Luther H. Cary was surgeon of the regiment for the first two years and was appointed medical inspector for XVI Corps.  After the war he served in the Wisconsin and California state legislatures.
 John Gillespie was captain of Co. E.  He was wounded and captured at the Battle of Atlanta and remained a prisoner for the last year of the war.  After the war he served as a Wisconsin legislator.
 Michael Griffin was a sergeant in Co. E and was wounded at Atlanta.  He was commissioned 2nd lieutenant shortly before the end of the war.  After the war he served as a U.S. congressman.
 Daniel Howell was captain of Co. G but resigned due to illness in 1863.  Before the war he served as a Wisconsin state senator.
 James Lennon was a sergeant in Co. H and was commissioned 2nd lieutenant near the end of the war.  After the war he served as a Wisconsin legislator and sheriff.
 Frank Howell Putney, a nephew of Daniel Howell, was enlisted in Co. G, rising to the rank of second lieutenant.  He was later detailed as an brigade adjutant and staff officer.  After the war he became a county judge.
 Charles Reynolds was sergeant major of the regiment, then second lieutenant, first lieutenant, and finally captain of Co. A.  Near the end of the war he was detached as assistant adjutant to General Charles Ewing.  After the war he served as a Wisconsin legislator.
 Daniel Robbins Sylvester was captain of Co. K through most of the war.  After the war he served as a Wisconsin legislator.
 Charles M. Webb was 1st lieutenant of Co. G for the first year of the war.  After the war he served as a Wisconsin legislator and circuit judge, and was a U.S. attorney under presidents Grant and Hayes.

See also

 List of Wisconsin Civil War units
 Wisconsin in the American Civil War

Notes

References
The Civil War Archive

External links
http://www.secondwi.com/wisconsinregiments/12th.htm - Transcription of the 12th Wisconsin entry in Quiner's Military History of Wisconsin, 1866
 

Military units and formations established in 1861
Military units and formations disestablished in 1865
Units and formations of the Union Army from Wisconsin
1861 establishments in Wisconsin